Rushbrooke is a village and former civil parish on the River Lark,  north west of Ipswich, now in the parish of Rushbrooke with Rougham, in the West Suffolk district, in the county of Suffolk, England. Until April 2019 Rushbrooke was in the St Edmundsbury district. In 1961 the parish had a population of 58.

Features 
Rushbrooke has a church called St Nicholas.

History 
The name "Rushbrooke" means 'Rush brook'. Rushbrooke was recorded in the Domesday Book as Rycebroc. Alternative names for Rushbrooke are "Rushbroke" and "Rushbrook". The surname Rushbrook derives from Rushbrooke. In 1912 R.B.W. Rushbrooke was the sole owner of Rushbrooke. On 1 April 1988 the parish was abolished and Rushbrooke with Rougham was created.

See also 
 Rushbrooke Hall

References

External links

Villages in Suffolk
Former civil parishes in Suffolk
Borough of St Edmundsbury
Thedwastre Hundred